John de Braideston (died after 1334) was an English Crown official who also served as a judge in Ireland.

His name suggests that he was born in Braydeston, a deserted medieval village close to Brundall, Norfolk: the Church of St Michael and All Angels, Braydeston still survives. He is first heard of in Kent in 1323, when he was in business as a corn merchant. In 1327 he was steward to Walter Reynolds, Archbishop of Canterbury, and the following year he sat on a commission of oyer and terminer in Surrey, suggesting that he was a qualified lawyer.

He was sent to Ireland as Chief Baron of the Irish Exchequer in 1329 and served in that office for two years. He then returned to England, and was still living in 1334.

References
Ball, F. Elrington The Judges in Ireland 1221-1921 John Murray London 1926

Chief Barons of the Irish Exchequer
Lawyers from Norfolk
14th-century English judges